Milana Yelamanovna Tazhenova (born 6 March 1999) is a Russian kazakh handball player who plays for Rostov-Don.

In September 2018, she was included by EHF in a list of the twenty best young handballers to watch for the future.

References
 

  
1999 births
Living people
Sportspeople from Astrakhan
Russian female handball players